The candela per square metre (symbol: cd/m2) is the unit of luminance in the International System of Units (SI). The unit is based on the candela, the SI unit of luminous intensity, and the square metre, the SI unit of area. The nit (symbol: nt) is a non-SI name also used for this unit (1 nt = 1 cd/m2).  The term nit is believed to come from the Latin word , "to shine".

As a measure of light emitted per unit area, this unit is frequently used to specify the brightness of a display device. The sRGB spec for monitors targets . Most consumer desktop liquid crystal displays have luminances of 200 to 300 cd/m2. HDR displays range from 450 to above 1600 cd/m2.

Comparison with other units of luminance
One candela per square metre is equal to:
10−4 stilbs (the CGS unit of luminance)
π×10−4 lamberts
π apostilbs
0.292 foot-lamberts
π×103 skots
π×107 brils
1 nit

See also
 Orders of magnitude (luminance)
 Photometry (optics)

References

External links
 IEC 61966-2-1:1999 Multimedia systems and equipment – Colour measurement and management – Part 2-1: Colour management – Default RGB colour space – sRGB
 IEC International System of Units zone

Units of luminance
SI derived units